Terminal 1 station can refer to:
 Narita Airport Terminal 1 Station
 Toronto Pearson Terminal 1 station
 Terminal 1–Lindbergh station
 Terminal 1-IGI Airport metro station
 Haneda Airport Terminal 1 Station
 Hongqiao Airport Terminal 1 station
 Airport Terminal 1 metro station
 Lambert Airport Terminal 1 station
 Terminal 1 (Mexico City Metrobús), a BRT station in Mexico City